George Anthony Frendo O.P. (born 4 April 1946) is a Maltese prelate and the Archbishop Emeritus of Tiranë-Durrës in Albania.

George Frendo was born in Qormi Malta on April 4, 1946. At the age of 15 he was professed as a member of the order of preachers. In 1963, Frendo started his studies for the priesthood together with Paul Cremona, later the Archbishop of Malta. Both Frendo and Cremona were ordained priests by Emanuele Gerada on April 2, 1969. Frendo served eight years as the parish priest of Gwardamanġa.

In 2006 Pope Benedict XVI appointed Frendo Auxiliary Bishop of Tiranë-Durrës in Albania with the titular see of Buthrotum. He was consecrated on September 23, 2006, by Rrok Kola Mirdita the Archbishop of Tiranë-Durrës and co-consecrated by the Apostolic Nuncio John Bulaitis and Archbishop Joseph Mercieca of Malta.

In November 16 Pope Francis appointed Bishop Frendo as the Archbishop of Tiranë-Durrës in Albania. He was installed on 3 December 2016.

On 20 April 2018, George Frendo obtained Albanian citizenship.

References

External links

 Albania Bishop George Frendo in Malta
 Times of Malta
 Catholic Hierarchy
 Archdiocese of Malta
 Malta Independent

1946 births
Living people
People from Qormi
20th-century Maltese Roman Catholic priests
Maltese Dominicans
Naturalized citizens of Albania
Bishops appointed by Pope Benedict XVI
Bishops appointed by Pope Francis
21st-century Roman Catholic archbishops in Albania
21st-century Roman Catholic bishops in Albania